Lemmon's Presbyterian Church is a historic Presbyterian church and cemetery located near Portersville in Boone Township, Dubois County, Indiana.  The church was built in 1860, and is a one-story, rectangular frame building with Greek Revival style design elements.  The one-room building has a gable front roof and rests on a sandstone pier foundation.  Also on the property is a contributing cemetery.  The church was renovated in 1992.

The church and cemetery were added to the National Register of Historic Places in 1992 as Lemmon's Church and Cemetery.

Gallery

References

Presbyterian churches in Indiana
Churches on the National Register of Historic Places in Indiana
Greek Revival church buildings in Indiana
Churches completed in 1860
Churches in Dubois County, Indiana
National Register of Historic Places in Dubois County, Indiana